Thomas Camp (fl. 1420), of Litlington, Cambridgeshire, was an English politician.

Family
Camp was the son of the MP, John Camp.

Career
He was a Member (MP) of the Parliament of England for Cambridgeshire in 1420.

References

Year of birth missing
Year of death missing
People from South Cambridgeshire District
English MPs 1420